Luis Uruñuela Fernández (born 2 April 1937) is a Spanish former politician of the Andalusian Party (PA).

He was elected to the Congress of Deputies in 1979, serving for only two months before leaving to be the first democratically elected mayor of Seville.

Uruñuela was a proponent of the Seville Metro, which saw much construction during his mandate. From 1983, his successor Manuel del Valle and the President of the Junta of Andalusia José Rodríguez de la Borbolla – both of the Spanish Socialist Workers' Party (PSOE) – halted the project.

In May 2009, Uruñuela, Del Valle and Soledad Becerril received Seville's medal for being the first three democratic mayors of the city. He used his speech to reiterate his support for expanding the Metro into the Casco Antiguo.

He had four daughters and a son. His first daughter, María José, died suddenly at the age of 46 in January 2012.

References

1937 births
Living people
People from Seville
Politicians from Andalusia
Members of the 2nd Congress of Deputies (Spain)
Mayors of Seville